The roundworm family Trichuridae includes the type genus Trichuris and some less widely known members. They are (after the abolishment of the artificial "Adenophorea" assemblage) placed in subclass Dorylaimia of the class Enoplea; however, the former might be better treated as a class in its own right. That nonwithstanding, their order (Trichocephalida) has been known under alternate names in the past, namely Trichiurida.

The genus Trichuris is particularly well known for being a common parasite of domestic animals and less usually humans. Its common name "whipworm" refers to the shape of these worms; they look like whips with wider "handles" at the posterior end.

The genera of Trichuridae are:
 Capillostrongyloides Freitas & Lent, 1935
 Liniscus
 Orthothominx Teixeira de Freitas & Jorge da Silva, 1960
 Pearsonema Teixeira de Freitas & Machado de Mendonça, 1960
 Sclerotrichum Rudolphi, 1819
 Tenoranema Mas-Coma & Esteban, 1985
 Trichuris

Footnotes

References 

  (2007): Family Trichuridae. Version of 2007-AUG-07. Retrieved 2010-MAY-05.

Parasitic nematodes of animals
Trichocephalida
Nematode families